Murati Lake is a lake in Estonia and Latvia.

See also
List of lakes of Estonia

Murati
Murati
Rõuge Parish
Murati